The Fifth Federal Electoral District of Baja California (V Distrito Electoral Federal de Baja California) is one of the 300 Electoral Districts into which Mexico is divided for the purpose of elections to the federal Chamber of Deputies and one of eight such districts in the state of Baja California.

It elects one deputy to the lower house of Congress for each three-year legislative period, by means of the first past the post system.

District territory
Under the 2005 redistricting process, it is made up of the central and eastern portions of the city of Tijuana.

The district's head town (cabecera distrital), where results from individual polling stations are gathered together and collated, is the city of Tijuana, Baja California.

Previous districting schemes

1996–2005 district
Between 1996 and 2005, this electoral district covered a similar area to its present limits, except that it extended south as far as Playas de Rosarito, thereby also including a rural area that it has since lost.

Deputies returned to Congress from this district 

LI Legislature
 1979–1982: María del Carmen Márquez (PRI)
LII Legislature
 1982–1985:
LIII Legislature
 1985–1988:
LIV Legislature
 1988–1991: Oscar Treviño Arredondo (PRI)
LV Legislature
 1991–1994: Miguel Ernesto Enciso Clark (PAN)
LVI Legislature
 1994–1997: Franciscana Krauss Velarde (PRI)
LVII Legislature
 1997–2000: Francisco Javier Reynoso Nuño (PAN)
LVIII Legislature
 2000–2003: José Francisco Blake Mora (PAN)
LIX Legislature
 2003–2006: José Guadalupe Osuna Millán (PAN)
LX Legislature
 2006–2009: Antonio Valladolid Rodríguez (PAN)

References

Federal electoral districts of Mexico
Baja California